Adjudant Chef Léon Marie Gaston Fulerand Leon Vitalis was a World War I flying ace credited with seven aerial victories, most of which were won as the machine gunner of his superior, Captain Didier Le Cour Grandmaison. After the war, he was also the founder of the Association des aces de 14-18, which aims to bring together for an annual meal the pilots and gunners mentioned in the army press release (an honour reserved for soldiers who have won 5 aerial victories, the threshold to become an ace ).

Biography

Youth 
Marie Gaston Fulcran Léon Vitalis was born on February 15, 1890, in Lodève, to a wealthy family. His father was a fabric manufacturer and his grandfather, also named Léon (1826-1879), was a centre-right deputy. After a one-year suspension for his studies, he did his military service at the age of 21 and was incorporated on October 2, 1911, in the 7th cuirassier regiment as a simple private. His level of education allowed him to rise in the ranks quickly and he was made a brigadier on April 2, 1912. However, Léon Vitalis was sent home prematurely due to a heart defect detected during his service, in September 1912. He was provisionally discharged before a commission ruled the following year that this malformation made him unfit for any military service.

World War I
His heart prevented him from reenlisting in the military on October 16, 1914. Despite everything, two years later, Léon Vitalis succeeded in enlisting for the duration of the war as a major on February 10, 1916. Thus, he can choose his service and opted for the Air Force, whose physical requirements are less restrictive. He was then sent to the aerial shooting school of Cazaux to become a gunner. Less than two months later, he graduated school to be assigned April 4 at the N.67 squadron where he carried out several missions in the Verdun sector as a gunner on a two-seater Nieuport 10. He won his first victory on  April 28, by shooting down a Fokker Eindecker which fell 200 meters from the French lines.

Léon Vitalis acquired a reputation as a good marksman at the front, which allowed him, May 21, 1916, to integrate (at his request) into the C.46 squadron. This experimental unit is the first to be equipped with Caudrons R.4, heavily armed three-seater twin-engine aircraft. Vitalis quickly became one of the two regular machine gunners of his unit commander, Captain Didier le Cour Grandmaison. The squadron quickly won its first victories in the Somme, with relatively few losses, especially with regard to the strategies employed: to compensate for the lack of maneuverability of their large twin-engines, the pilots of the C.46 let the German fighters get closer to the maximum before their machine gunners riddled them with bullets. The Caudrons therefore rarely return without bullet damage.

Léon Vitalis found this strategy a good way to exercise his shooting skills and won his second aerial victory on July 15, 1916, by forcing an LVG C to land. A third victory, over an Eindecker, followed on 6 September which earned Vitalis the award of the military medal. He won three more before the end of the year: an LVG on October 20, a Roland the November 10 and an Albatross on the 16th of the same month. Two days after this sixth victory, the new ace was mentioned in the press release to the armies and acquired national fame through the media coverage of the aces' victories in the major newspapers.

 
Vitalis spent the end of 1916 resting, like the rest of the C.46 squadron, after its good results in the Somme. He notably returned to the Cazaux shooting school, this time as an instructor, for two weeks.

In April 1917, Léon Vitalis returned to the front with his squadron, in an area where the fighting was much fiercer: the Chemin des Dames 4. April 14, he won his seventh and last approved victory, on a plane piloted by Captain Le Cour Grandmaison 4. The latter was killed, like many of his squadron mates, a little less than a month later by the German ace Heinrich Gontermann.

Léon Vitalis was overtaken by his health problems a few months after his return to the front. His heart problems, coupled with nervous exhaustion, led to his evacuation to the VR 75 hospital in Viry-Châtillon, the July 28, 1917. He comes out from August but must remain in Paris for a long convalescence.

On November 10, 1917, Vitalis wrote to his superiors to give up his convalescence and offer to be assigned to the Cazaux base as a shooting instructor, which he was granted. It was there that he was decorated with the Knight's Cross of the Legion of Honor on December 27, 1917, for all of his successes. Finally, Léon Vitalis returned to the front in 1918 and won a probable victory on May 21. At the end of October, he joined a new experimental squadron, supposed to be equipped with Hanriot HD.3 4 two-seater fighters, as weapons and fire. The H.174 squadron will however not be operational before the signing of the armistice.

After the war
Considered an active soldier, Léon Vitalis was only demobilized on August 14, 1919, at the request of his family, so that he could take over the management of the family drapery business and its 350 workers. He then retired to Lodève but ended up settling shortly afterwards in the Loiret at the head of his own business. However, he remained in the army reserve, first being assigned to the 4th cuirassier regiment, then to the Cazaux shooting school, with the rank of lieutenant from October 1924. He was also promoted to Officer of the Legion of Honor in 1928, then to Commander in 1935. It is also there Léon Vitalis founded the association of aces of 14-18, bringing together annually all the pilots and gunners mentioned in the press release to the armies.

His heart problems persisted, however, and in 1931, his superiors reserved him for an instructor position in case of war, despite his intact shooting skills. Vitalis was finally removed from the executives permanently at his request in 1936, after a crisis of tachycardia.

He was therefore not mobilized in 1939. After the German invasion of France, Vitalis left Loiret to seek refuge in his hometown of Lodève, in the free zone. This is where he dies, August 17, 1941, at age 51.

Bibliography 
Notes

References 
 - Total pages: 228
 - Total pages: 196 

French World War I flying aces
1890 births
1941 deaths